The 1943 Southern Conference men's basketball tournament took place in March 1943 at Thompson Gym in Raleigh, North Carolina. The George Washington Colonials won their first Southern Conference title, led by head coach Otis Zahn.

Format
The top eight finishers of the conference's fifteen members were eligible for the tournament. Teams were seeded based on conference winning percentage. The tournament used a preset bracket consisting of three rounds.

Bracket

* Overtime game

See also
List of Southern Conference men's basketball champions

References

Tournament
Southern Conference men's basketball tournament
Southern Conference men's basketball tournament
Southern Conference men's basketball tournament
Basketball competitions in Raleigh, North Carolina
College sports tournaments in North Carolina
College basketball in North Carolina